William Hinton may refer to:
Bill Hinton (William Frederick Weston Hinton, 1895–1976), British professional footballer
William A. Hinton (politician) (1862–1920), Minnesota politician
William Augustus Hinton (1883–1959), American bacteriologist, pathologist, and educator
William H. Hinton (1919–2004), American Marxist, farmer, and writer